Quintilia is a genus of cicadas made up of 
Quintilia annulivena
Quintilia aurora
Quintilia carinata
Quintilia catena
Quintilia conspersa
Quintilia dorsalis
Quintilia frontalis
Quintilia monilifera
Quintilia musca
Quintilia obliqua
Quintilia pallidiventris
Quintilia peregrina
Quintilia primitiva
Quintilia punctigera
Quintilia rufiventris
Quintilia semipunctata
Quintilia umbrosa
Quintilia vitripennis
Quintilia vittativentris
Quintilia walkeri
Quintilia wealei Image

Malagasiini
Cicadidae genera